Wankspitze (elevation ) is a summit of the Mieming Range in the Austrian state of Tyrol. It separates the Griessspitzen to the north from the Mieming Plateau to the south.

Mountains of the Alps
Two-thousanders of Austria
Mountains of Tyrol (state)